The 1963 County Championship was the 64th officially organised running of the County Championship. Yorkshire won their second consecutive Championship title.

The method for deciding the championship was changed as follows -

Most points to determine champions
Follow on restored
One-day rules apply if the first two-thirds of playing time lost due to weather
10 points for a win
5 points for a tie
2 points for first innings lead in a drawn or lost match
1 point for a tie on first innings in a match drawn or lost
6 points for a win under one day rules

Table

Note: Northamptonshire gained five points instead of two in drawn match when scores finished level and they were batting.

References

1963 in English cricket
County Championship seasons